The Fife Circle Line is the local rail service north from Edinburgh. It links towns of south Fife and the coastal towns along the Firth of Forth before heading to Edinburgh. Operationally, the service is not strictly a circle route, but, rather, a point to point service that reverses at the Edinburgh end, and has a large bi-directional balloon loop at the Fife end.

Service
The service includes the Edinburgh-Dunfermline stretch of the East Coast Main Line, which includes the world-famous Forth Bridge. On the Fife side, while this main line hugs the coast, the circle is formed by a line from Inverkeithing that loops back round to Kirkcaldy by an inland route via Cowdenbeath through the old Fife coalfield. Narrowly speaking, just this line could be called the Fife Circle.

During the 1970s and 80s British Rail only ran a regular daytime service on the Dunfermline line as far as Cowdenbeath;   & Cardenden were only served during the weekday business peaks (as can be seen from Table 242 of the UK All Line timetable of that era), whilst the remainder of the route to Thornton Junction was freight-only (having been closed to passengers in 1969). All local stopping trains on the coast line meanwhile terminated at Kirkcaldy.

On 15 May 1989,  BR decided to link the two services together by reopening the eastern end of the old Edinburgh and Northern Railway Dunfermline branch to passenger traffic, and run an 'out & back' service from Edinburgh from the start of the summer timetable, which also saw a new Sunday service being reintroduce over parts of Cardenden section, the first time since 1976. This is listed in the timetables as the northern terminal of the Fife Circle and is the point at which certain trains terminate - the rest continue back to Edinburgh along the opposite side of the 'circle'. In March 1998, Dalgety Bay opened, and in 2000, a new station was opened in the expanding eastern suburbs of Dunfermline and given the name of Dunfermline Queen Margaret, after the nearby Queen Margaret hospital. Another new station was built on the edge of Edinburgh, called Edinburgh Gateway, and was opened in December 2016 to provide connections by tram to the nearby Edinburgh Airport.

There is a goods line connection from Dunfermline to Stirling via Longannet Power Station that rail campaigners would like to reopen to passengers, as it has already been between Stirling and Alloa. The current line via Longannet and Kincardine was last used by passenger trains in 1930, though a Stirling - Alloa - Dunfermline (Upper) service ran via the Stirling and Dunfermline Railway (now closed east of Alloa) until October 1968.  Coal trains that formerly crossed the Forth Bridge en route to Longannet Power Station were rerouted by that line so that the bridge's maximum signalling capacity for trains can be used to increase the local passenger service; Longannet Power Station closed in 2017 and all coal train movements ceased although the site is now being redeveloped by Talgo to build new trains in the UK. The line between Alloa and Dunfermline is not currently signalled to passenger carrying standards. The Fife Circle is a priority for present investment in new rolling stock. Its morning peak services can be notoriously overcrowded.

Service patterns
All services are run by ScotRail.

Northbound

1tph Edinburgh to  via Dunfermline City
1tph Edinburgh to Glenrothes with Thornton via Cowdenbeath (continues back to Edinburgh via the coast)
2tph Edinburgh to Glenrothes with Thornton via Kirkcaldy (one continues back to Edinburgh via Dunfermline City, the other terminates at Glenrothes)

Southbound

1tph Cowdenbeath to Edinburgh
1tph Glenrothes with Thornton to Edinburgh via Dunfermline City (from Edinburgh via the coast)
2tph Glenrothes with Thornton to Edinburgh via Kirkcaldy (one through from Edinburgh via Cowdenbeath)

In the evening, there are hourly services to Glenrothes via Cowdenbeath and to Kirkcaldy only (some of the latter continue to/from Dundee).  Sundays see an hourly service in both directions around the full circle to Glenrothes.

Some services regularly ran through to/from  until 2015, but with the opening of the Borders Railway in September that year this routing ceased (except for a small number of weekday peak trains).

Stops on the Fife Circle line

Edinburgh to Fife
 is major station of the Scottish capital, under the castle rock and opening onto Princes Street and its gardens.
 serves the city centre's West End and Tollcross districts.
 is located in the South Gyle residential suburb. It also serves the South Gyle industrial estate, the Gyle Shopping Centre, and is about a kilometre from the suburb of Corstorphine.
 is located next to the Gogar roundabout and features an interchange with Edinburgh Trams that can be used to travel to Edinburgh Airport. 
 is the station at the south end of the Forth Bridge. It is at the edge of South Queensferry.
 is the village at the north end of the Forth Bridge.
 is ancient burgh and port with a history of shipbreaking.

Here the main line and loop line divide.

Loop line
 serves the town, although it is not near the port. It also serves the south of Dunfermline.
 serves the centre of Dunfermline.
 serves Dunfermline's eastern suburbs and is near Queen Margaret hospital.
, serves the town and the nearby village of Kelty.
 serves the town and the Benarty coalfield villages.
 serves all areas of the former mining town.
, serves the village of Thornton, and the new town of Glenrothes.

Main line
 serves the modern town with a shining whitewash look and busy railway station.
 serves the village with awards for its "silver sands" quiet beaches.
 serves the seaside resort town facing directly across to Edinburgh.
 serves the town at the "horn" of the coast where it turns from facing Edinburgh to the open North Sea.
 serves the still active old market town hugging the coast with an unusual long sea promenade off the town centre.

The two lines join forming a circle.

Future services

The east peninsula of Fife beyond Kirkcaldy is not served by railways post-Beeching. At one time a railway ran all the way from Thornton to St Andrews round the coast of Fife.  The Beeching Report in fact recommended services continue between Thornton and Leven but these fell victim, like services on other Fife branch lines, to widespread apathy in the post-Beeching era.  The devolved Scottish government is considering backing a branch reopening to Leven, where a new station will be built next to the swimming pool and at the disused power station. This is to satisfy the long term upward trend of cross-Forth communications in Fife's economy. Along this branch line is Cameron Bridge which serves Windygates and Kennoway, where the line runs close to Scotland's largest distillery and Diageo's main Scottish bottling operations.

The 5-mile Leven branch line continued to operate until 2001 supplying coal to Methil Power Station. Trials of freight trains continued at least until 2003.   From 2011, a one-mile stretch of the line was reopened for freight services from Earlseat opencast pit to the mainline at Thornton.  Levenmouth is now the largest urban area in Scotland unserved by direct rail services (37,500 in Levenmouth excluding the nearby East Neuk where an estimated 8,500 catchment exists). STAG (Scottish Transport Appraisal Guidance) appraisals conducted in 2008 and again in 2015 indicated a positive case. A subsequent analysis described the report as not "as robust as it should have been", however further sustainability studies have continued and are ongoing as of 2019.

Supporters of the line argue it would provide better services to support major industrial sites at Fife Energy Park, Methil Docks, the Low Carbon Park (under construction), Diageo, the businesses along the Leven Valley (including Donaldsons) and major retailers in Leven located close to the line.  Levenmouth is an area of high deprivation and Fife Council estimates that an hourly train link (using the Fife Circle services) to Edinburgh would increase available job vacancies by 500% since commuting for work would become possible. The plan to re-open the rail link to Leven was approved by the Scottish Government on 8 August 2019.

It has also been proposed to start a Burntisland - Leith ferry crossing in order to spread some of the Fife-Edinburgh traffic. A previous attempt at promoting this ferry service as a commuter route in 1991 failed after 18 months. Leith itself, now Edinburgh's government district, is not served by rail but is planned to be linked to the Edinburgh tram network.

Electrification 
The £55 million first phase, to electrify  of Fife Circle track, between Haymarket and Dalmeny, for use by battery electric multiple units, was begun by Scottish Powerlines in June 2022 and is due to be completed by December 2024. Further phases will electrify the lines between Kinghorn, Thornton, Ladybank and Lochgelly.

References

Transport in Edinburgh
Transport in Fife
Railway lines in Scotland
Standard gauge railways in Scotland